is a 2002 video game released for the GameCube. It was followed up by Bomberman Jetters.

Gameplay
Bomberman Generation consists of six worlds consisting of about five levels each. The levels involve puzzles, mini games, Pokémon-like battles using Charaboms who get befriended by Bomberman once defeated, and Charabom or bomb merge areas where a merge item and a bomb get fused or a Charabom and another Charabom get fused resulting in a stronger bomb or Charabom. Pommy (Pomyu) from Bomberman 64: The Second Attack and a few of his variations make appearances as Charaboms. The worlds have unique bosses each with a different strategy of defeating them. All of the worlds have puzzles that the player has to solve with bombs or Charaboms. Bomberman can acquire various power-ups which can increase his speed and his bomb power.

Bomberman Generation was one of the first titles to employ the style of cel-shading for the GameCube, a style utilized again in the follow-up game Bomberman Jetters.

The multiplayer mode resembles that of the classic games in that the players can no longer utilize full three-dimensional movement. The battles can consist of up to four human or computer characters. There are five different modes from which to choose:

 Standard Battle: This mode consists of classic Bomberman multiplayer where four players attempt to defeat one another by using bombs. Whoever is the last man standing wins. In the last minute of the battle, blocks drop along the edges of the arena, making it smaller and smaller until someone wins or time runs out, which ends in a tie. This mode has a variety of levels from which to choose, and the player can decide how often the power-ups appear.
 Reversi Battle: Bomb explosions flip the green floor panels to the color of whichever Bomber dropped the bomb. However, opponents can flip the panels previously flipped by other players. Whoever has the most panels matching their corresponding Bomber when time is up is the winner.
 Coin Battle: By blowing up treasure barrels, players attempt to find the most coins before time runs out. Being killed causes the player to lose half of their coins. As the match progresses, Hige Hige Bandits appear to steal the coins, but blowing them up releases the coins and additional power-ups.
 Dodge Battle: Bombers cannot drop bombs; rather, bombs fall from the sky, and everyone must avoid the explosions. Bombers are equipped solely with Bomb Kicks, Punches, and Speed-Ups to avoid the blasts. The blast area of each bomb is shown on the arena floor. As the match progresses, a variety of different bombs and patterns of bombs will fall.
 Revenge Battle: All Bombers are in Revenge Bomber mode, and get points depending on how many moles they can stun or blow up. The bombs only go as far as the cursor allows, and merely stunning the moles with a bomb does not give the player as many points as making one explode.

Plot
According to the game's opening scene, stories of the origin of the universe's power have circulated for years, but it was not until recently that the source of the power has been found.  Six crystals, named the "Bomb Elements," are said to contain unfathomable, though unknown, powers.  So Professor Ein sends a space freighter to retrieve them and return to Planet Bomber for analysis.

However, en route to Planet Bomber, the freighter is attacked by a hired gun and is destroyed. The Bomb Elements fall out but are sucked in by the gravitational pull of the nearby planet Tentacalls. Professor Ein receives word that the Hige Hige Bandits, led by Bomberman's arch-enemy Mujoe, are making large scale moves towards Tentacalls, and it turns out that they were the ones responsible for the freighter attack. Not only that, but the Bandits have allied themselves with Bomberman's rivals, the Crush Bombers, who are also on the move to get the Elements for Mujoe.

Professor Ein orders Bomberman to Tentacalls to defeat the Crush Bombers and the Hige Hige Bandits, and to get the Bomb Elements before they do, for if even one element falls into their hands, then the universe would be as Mujoe pleases. Thus begins Bomberman's latest chapter to restore peace and order to the galaxy.

Reception

Bomberman Generation received "favorable" reviews according to the review aggregation website Metacritic. In Japan, Famitsu gave it a score of 27 out of 40.

The game was nominated for "Best Platformer on GameCube" and "Best Game No One Played on GameCube" at GameSpots Best and Worst of 2002 Awards, both of which went to Super Mario Sunshine and Sega Soccer Slam, respectively.

References

External links
Bomberman Generation at Hudson Soft (Japanese) on Wayback Machine
Nintendo page on Wayback Machine

2002 video games
Action-adventure games
Generation
GameCube games
GameCube-only games
Majesco Entertainment games
Video games developed in Japan
Video games with cel-shaded animation
Multiplayer and single-player video games
Game Arts games
Hudson Soft games